Aleksi Emanuel Lehtonen (21 June 1891 – 27 March 1951) was archbishop of Turku from 1945 till 1951.

Education
Lehtonen was born on June 21, 1891, Uusikaupunki. He attended school in Uusikaupunki, where he graduated as a student at the age of 16. He studied theology at the University of Helsinki and graduated in 1911. He graduated with a Bachelor of Theology in 1917 and a Licentiate in 1921. He earned his Doctor of Theology in 1923.

Career
He was ordained to priesthood on 10 June 1911 and was appointed as priest in Lavia. In 1917 he became vicar of a parish in Helsinki and in 1922 he was appointed assistant professor of pastoral theology in University of Helsinki. In 1932 he became the Professor of Practical Theology.

After the sudden departure of Bishop Jaakko Gummerus, Lehtonen was elected Bishop of Tampere in 1934. He was consecrated that same year in Tampere Cathedral by three bishops, Erkki Kaila of Viipuri, Max von Bonsdorff of Borgå and Erling Eidem of Uppsala. It was through him that the apostolic succession was reinstated in the Church of Finland through the consecration initiated by Erling Eidem, the Archbishop of Uppsala. Nevertheless, even though the apostolic succession was considered an important factor to reinstate, it was not considered a requirement by the Finnish Church for a valid consecration. Lehtonen was appointed Archbishop of Turku on March 14, 1945, and was installed on June 10 in Turku Cathedral. He was active in the Ecumenical movement and sought Evangelical Lutheran Church of Finland to have closer relationship with Church of England. His son Samuel Lehtonen became Bishop of Helsinki.

References

External links
 "Towards 'a real reunion'?" : Archbishop Aleksi Lehtonen's efforts for closer relations with the Church of England 1945–1951 by Mika K.T. Pajunen, 2008
 Report of the Committee Appointed to Confer with Representatives of the Church of Finland In Accordance with Resolution 38 of the Lambeth Conference, 1930

1891 births
1951 deaths
People from Uusikaupunki
People from Turku and Pori Province (Grand Duchy of Finland)
Lutheran archbishops and bishops of Turku
20th-century Lutheran archbishops
Academic staff of the University of Helsinki